The 2009 World Single Distance Speed Skating Championships were held between 12 March and 15 March 2009 in the Richmond Olympic Oval, Richmond, BC, Canada.

Schedule

Medal summary

Men's events

Note: TR = Track record

Women's events

Note: TR = Track record

Medal table

References
 Official results

2009 World Single Distance
2009 in speed skating
World Single Distance, 2009
Sport in Vancouver
World Single Distance Speed Skating Championships